The Hyundai ix35 FCEV or Tucson FCEV is a hydrogen fuel cell electric vehicle developed by Hyundai. The model is a left-hand drive only conversion to the SUV platform it is based on and was the first of its type to be mass-produced and sold commercially in the world. Different versions are known, the previous version was based on the Hyundai Tucson FCEV, and the upcoming model is based on the current ix35 FCEV.

The third generation is based on the Hyundai ix35 (2009), production was semi automatic and used a metal bipolar plate.

The current version and fourth generation is the 2012 ix35 FCEV. This improvement in range is due in part to the Tucson ix35 FCEV's greater space for holding Hydrogen tanks of compressed hydrogen, higher storage pressure, as well as fuel cell technology advances.

The cars have made use of a "sandwich" design concept, aimed at maximizing room for both passengers and the propulsion components. The fuel cell is a proton exchange membrane fuel cell (PEMFC).

Tucson ix35 FCEV (2012)

The Hyundai ix35 FCEV is in production since 2013, a production vehicle that is powered by a fuel cell with hydrogen. Hyundai indicates an output of 100 kW (136PS) and a torque of 300 Nm. A tank contains 5.64 kg of hydrogen and should last for a range of nearly 600 km.

Production
In February 2013, Hyundai announced that it started production at Ulsan, South Korea of Hyundai ix35 based FCEV's. In 2015, the production of 10,000 units started. The first fifteen cars went to the hydrogen link network, Copenhagen and two to Hydrogen Sweden, Skåne. In 2015, vehicles were ordered or delivered in eleven countries in the EU, and fifteen countries in total worldwide. Up to June 2015, 273 cars had been shipped out for sales (including 29 in Korea, 116 in the United States, and 117 in Europe).

Hydrogen storage
The 700 Bar (10,153 PSI) hydrogen tanks for hydrogen storage contain enough fuel for a  drive.

Recognition
The Hyundai ix35 fuel cell electric vehicle won the Future Auto accolade at the 2013 Brussels Motor Show.

Canada
The first Hyundai Tucson Fuel Cell (ix35) sold in Canada was delivered in January 2015. Due to the location of refill stations, the vehicles are only leased or sold in the Vancouver Metropolitan Area/Fraser Valley, British Columbia; the Greater Toronto Area; and in Alberta.

South Korea
The ix35 FCEV is priced at KRW85 million (US$77,300) with a South Korean government subsidy of KRW60 million (US$57,707), the start of mass production and the use of cheaper materials in the future should lead to lower prices.

Discontinued due to launching the successor, the Hyundai Nexo in 2018.

United States
The first ix35 FCEV was delivered in June 2014 in Tustin (California) with a lease price of $499/mo, a  $2,999 down payment with unlimited free fuelling for a three-year period.

Tucson FCEV (2005)

The Tucson Fuel Cell Electric Vehicle (FCEV) is a test fuel cell vehicle for Hyundai's second generation hydrogen fuel cell.

The vehicle includes an 80 kW electric motor by Enova Systems of Torrance, California, UTC Fuel Cells by South Windsor, Connecticut, 152V battery co developed by Hyundai Motor Co. and LG Chem in Seoul, Korea,  hydrogen storage tanks developed by Dynetek Industries Ltd. of Calgary, Alberta, Canada.

The vehicle was unveiled in 2005 at the Los Angeles Auto Show and completed a  journey as part of the Hydrogen Road Tour in 2008.

See also

List of fuel cell vehicles
Hyundai Nexo

References

External links
 ix35 Fuel Cell

Hydrogen cars
Fuel cell vehicles
Hyundai